Anne Lintzenich Andrews is an American pediatrician, activist, and former political candidate. She is a professor of pediatrics at the Medical University of South Carolina in Charleston, South Carolina. She was the Democratic Party's nominee for South Carolina's 1st congressional district in the 2022 United States House of Representatives elections, which she lost to incumbent Republican Representative Nancy Mace.

Biography
Andrews was born Anne Elizabeth Lintzenich in Paducah, Kentucky, and grew up in Indianapolis, Indiana. She received her bachelor's degree from the University of Dayton in Dayton, Ohio, her master's degree in clinical research from the Medical University of South Carolina (MUSC), and her M.D. from the University of Cincinnati in Cincinnati, Ohio. She then completed her medical residency in pediatrics in Cincinnati before moving to the Lowcountry of South Carolina in 2009. In 2011, she married Charlie Andrews, a neurological critical care doctor at MUSC. They live in Mount Pleasant with their three children.

Andrews became interested in political activism after the Parkland shooting in 2018, which convinced her to join the gun safety advocacy group Moms Demand Action. She has also conducted academic research on gun violence prevention, which she views as directly related to her job providing medical care to children as a pediatrician. She announced her candidacy for South Carolina's 1st district in November 2021, making her the first Democrat to do so. This is also Andrews' first time running for political office. She won the Democratic nomination in June 2022 after running unopposed in the primary.

In September, Mace began running campaign ads accusing Andrews of engaging in "child abuse" by providing gender-affirming care to minors. Andrews responded by releasing a statement which said, "I knew politics would be ugly but I never thought I’d see the day when my own congresswoman would accuse me- a pediatrician for over a decade- of ‘child abuse'...I do not support gender-affirming surgery for anyone under 18- nor does my hospital perform those procedures. What I support is evidence-based medical care, with parental consent, for teens struggling with gender identity issues." She also announced that she would immediately begin taking unpaid leave from her job as a pediatrician at the MUSC Shawn Jenkins Children's Hospital. In October, Andrews was endorsed by the editorial board of the Charleston City Paper.

Andrews lost the election for the 1st district on November 8, 2022, receiving 42.5% of the vote to Mace's 56.5%. She called Mace to concede soon afterwards, and Mace responded by thanking her for "stepping into the arena" by running for office. Andrews also stated that she is unsure where her political career will go next, but that her candidacy encouraged more of her fellow medical professionals to follow in her footsteps by running for elected office.

See also
2022 United States House of Representatives elections in South Carolina § District 1

References

External links
Campaign website
Faculty page

Living people
21st-century American women physicians
21st-century American physicians
American pediatricians
People from Paducah, Kentucky
University of Dayton alumni
Medical University of South Carolina faculty
South Carolina Democrats
University of Cincinnati College of Medicine alumni
Medical University of South Carolina alumni
Year of birth missing (living people)
Candidates in the 2022 United States House of Representatives elections